The Four Companions, also called the Four Pillars of the Sahaba, is a Shia term for the four Companions of the Islamic prophet Muhammad who are supposed to have stayed most loyal to Ali ibn Abi Talib after Muhammad's death in 632:

 Salman al-Fārisī
 Abū Dharr al-Ghifāri
 Miqdad ibn Aswād al-Kindi
 Ammār ibn Yāsir

Salman is generally considered to be the loftiest amongst these elite four in Shia theology. It is narrated from the prophet Muhammad that:

Faith has ten grades, and Salman is on the tenth (i.e., highest) grade, Abu Dharr on the ninth, and Miqdad on the eighth grade.

The following hadith is narrated about them from Jabir al-Ansari:

The Messenger of Allah said: "Glad tidings Oh Ali! For verily you and your companions and your Shi'ah will be in Heaven."Abu Nu'aym al-Isfahani, Hilyat al-Awliya, vol. 4, p. 329Al-Tabarani, Al-Mu'jam al-Kabir, vol. 1, p. 319Ibn Asakir, Ta'rikh Dimashq, vol. 42, pp. 331-332

These companions were later referred to as "The Real Shia." Abdullah ibn Abbas, Ubay ibn Ka'b, Bilal ibn Rabah, Muhammad ibn Abi Bakr, Malik al-Ashtar, and Hudhayfah ibn al-Yaman were other such partisans. However, it is only The Four Companions that are supposed to have attained distinction in their devotion to Ali.

See also
 Hadith of the pond of Khumm
 Sulaym ibn Qays

References

4 Companions
Shia Islam
Quartets